Camperdown Works was a jute works in Dundee, Scotland, which covered around 30 acres and at one point employed over 14,000, mostly female, workers. It was for a time the world's largest jute works and was owned by Cox Brothers.

Origins
The Cox family was connected with the linen trade in Lochee from the early 18th century when a member of the Cox family was a small manufacturer in the area. In 1827 James Cock (subsequently known as Cox), the son of James Cock of Foggyley and Helen Scott, assumed control of the family business and in 1841 formed a co-partnering with his brothers, William Cox, Thomas Hunter Cox and George Addison Cox. The firm was quick to adopt the most recent improvements and moved over from the linen trade to jute. In 1849 they began construction of Camperdown Works, in Lochee and within a few years all of their operations relating to the manufacture of jute were carried out in these works.

Development
The first building to be erected on the site by the Cox Brothers was the power loom factory which was the largest ever built in the city of Dundee. A hand loom factory was built to its north in 1853, holding 225 looms. One of the most significant developments on the site was the High Mill, which author Mark Watson argues to have been one of the finest textile mills in Victorian Scotland. It was built in three stages from 1857 and included a 100-foot clock tower. By 1878 the works had its own railway branch, made its own machinery and employed 4,500 workers, a total which had risen to 5,000 by 1900.

A foundry and stables, which could hold up to thirty horses, were built in the 1860s. Also on the site was a half-time school which was built in 1884 and closed in 1896. Other buildings included warehouses, a small fire-station and a three-bay shed for railway engines using the works' branchline, which joined the nearby Dundee and Newtyle Railway.

The works' 'greatest landmark' was its 282 foot high brick chimney, known as "Cox's Stack". Built between 1865 and 1866 it was designed by the architect James Maclaren and the engineer George Addison Cox, one of the Cox brothers. The stack was linked to the Works' 57 boilers and could be seen when approaching Dundee from the south by crossing the River Tay. The stack still stands today and is Scotland's tallest surviving industrial chimney.

The works dominated Lochee and was the area's primary employer. Its success helped transform the former village of Lochee into prosperous community in the nineteenth century and promoted the development of other trades such as furniture manufacture.

Production at the works ceased in 1981 and some parts of the complex were sold for demolition in 1985. The site was used as a double for 1940s Berlin in the 1980s BBC television drama Christabel.

Management
Following James Cox's death in 1885 his son Edward took a key role in the management of the works and Cox Brothers Ltd which became a Limited Liability Company, in 1893. In 1920 the firm became a part of a new Dundee-based company Jute Industries Ltd. This was a new venture which acquired several of Dundee's jute works. Jute Industries' Chairman from 1920 to 1948 was James Ernest Cox, the son of Edward Cox. Jute Industries became Sidlaw Industries Ltd in 1971. In 1940 Jute Industries advertised themselves as 'the largest firm of jute spinners and manufacturers in Great Britain'

In addition to Camperdown Works, Cox Brothers had several offices. In 1888 these included premises in Meadow Place Dundee, as well as Glasgow, Manchester and London.

References

External links
Domesday Reloaded Camperdown Works Dundee 1986 
Cox Brothers Ltd, Jute Spinners and Manufacturers, and Cox Family Papers at University of Dundee Archive Services
Cox Brothers, Jute Spinners and Manufactures, Dundee at University of Dundee Archive Services  
Cox family website  

Buildings and structures in Dundee
Economy of Dundee
1849 establishments in Scotland
Textile mills in Scotland
Jute mills
History of Dundee
Manufacturing plants in Scotland
Buildings and structures demolished in 1985
Demolished buildings and structures in Scotland